"" (Now is the time) is a Christian hymn with words by Alois Albrecht and music by Ludger Edelkötter. The song of the genre Neues Geistliches Lied (NGL) has appeared in German hymnals and songbooks

History 
 wrote the words of the hymn and  the music. The song has appeared in songbooks.

Text 
The text begins with a short refrain, and has eight stanzas. The refrain claims that the time to decide what is important is now, and that we do it today or not. The premise is the second coming of Jesus, and the stanzas give details of questions a believer will have to face then, and of questions that do not matter. In the first stanza, the questions that will not come are "What did you saye?" ("Was hast du gespart?) and "What did you own? (Was hast du alles besessen?), but: "What did you give?" (Was hast du geschenkt?) and "Whom did you cherish?" (Wen hast du geschätzt?) Each stanza but the last ends with "for my sake" (um meinetwillen).

References 

Christian hymns
Contemporary Christian songs
1972 songs
20th-century hymns in German
Neues Geistliches Lied